Christian values historically refers to values derived from the teachings of Jesus Christ. The term has various applications and meanings, and specific definitions can vary widely between denominations, geographical locations and different schools of thought. The terms Christian values and family values are often used as a euphemism for familialism by the Christian right. Christian values also relate to the Christian identity in identity politics.

Paul
Since the first century, The Bible has summarized Christians values as the Fruit of the Spirit. The list, written by the Apostle Paul in his letter to the Galatians includes:
 Love
 Joy
 Peace
 Patience
 Kindness 
 Goodness
 Faithfulness 
 Gentleness
 Self-control

Modern use in worldwide conservative or right-wing politics 

In the 21st-century United States, Australia, United Kingdom and other countries, the phrases Christian values and family values are used by Christian right and conservative parties to describe some or all of the following political stances:

Modern interpretations of Christian values include: 
 Censorship of sexual content, especially in films and on television.
 Sexual abstinence outside marriage and abstinence-only sex education.
 The promotion of intelligent design to be taught in public schools and colleges as an alternative to evolution.
 The desirability of laws against same-sex marriage.
 Support for laws against the acceptance of homosexuality into mainstream society.
 The desirability of organized school prayer in public schools.

See also 
 Biblical law in Christianity
 Brotherly love (philosophy)
 Christian ethics
 Family values
 Jesusism
 Red-Letter Christians

References 

Values
Christian terminology
Political terminology
Value (ethics)